Building Bridges may refer to:

Building Bridges (1989 album), an Australian multi-artist album
Building Bridges (Paul Field album)
"Building Bridges" (song), a country music song recorded by Larry Willoughby, Nicolette Larson, and Brooks & Dunn
Building Bridges (residential program)
"Building Bridges", the theme and official song of the Eurovision Song Contest 2015
 USPS Building Bridges Special Postal Cancellation Series